The 2013–14 TCU Horned Frogs basketball team represents Texas Christian University in the 2013–14 NCAA Division I women's basketball season. This is head coach Jeff Mittie's fifteenth season at TCU. They play their home games at Daniel–Meyer Coliseum in Fort Worth, Texas and were members of the Big 12 Conference. They finished the season with a record of 18–15 overall, 8–10 in Big 12 play for a finish in seventh place. They lost in the quarterfinals in the 2014 Big 12 women's basketball tournament to West Virginia. They were invited to the 2014 Women's National Invitation Tournament which they lost in the first round to Colorado.

Roster

Schedule and results 
Sources:

|-
!colspan=9 style="background:#342A7B; color:#FFFFFF;"| Exhibition

|-
!colspan=9 style="background:#342A7B; color:#FFFFFF;"| Non-Conference Games

|-
!colspan=9 style="background:#342A7B; color:#FFFFFF;"| Conference Games

|-
!colspan=9 style="background:#FFFFFF; color:#342A7B;"| 2014 Big 12 Conference women's basketball tournament

|-
!colspan=9 style="background:#FFFFFF; color:#342A7B;"| WNIT

See also 
 2013–14 TCU Horned Frogs basketball team

References 

Tcu
TCU Horned Frogs women's basketball seasons
2014 Women's National Invitation Tournament participants
TCU Lady Frogs
TCU Lady Frogs